Songino (Onion) is a sum of Zavkhan Province in western Mongolia. The sum center former location was 48 53 10 N 95 52 34 E. In 2005, its population was 1,921.

References 

Districts of Zavkhan Province